Upper Stondon is a village in Bedfordshire, England, part of the wider Stondon civil parish.

Upper Stondon is a very small settlement with few amenities. However, the village of Lower Stondon and nearby Henlow Camp have extensive local amenities and services.

External links
 Stondon Village Website
 Stondon Parish Council Website

Villages in Bedfordshire
Central Bedfordshire District